Pseudobalistes fuscus (common names: blue triggerfish, rippled triggerfish, yellow-spotted triggerfish and blue-and-gold triggerfish) is a fish belonging to the family Balistidae.

Description

Pseudobalistes fuscus can reach a length of 55 centimetres (22 inches) in males. The body is mainly brown, but fins have yellow margins. Juveniles are yellowish brown with a network of brilliant bluish wavy lines. With growth these lines become interconnected.

This fish is known for its aggressiveness and many divers choose to stay away from them, as they bite often.

Distribution
This species is widespread in the Tropical Indo-Pacific, from the Red Sea to South Africa, Society Islands, southern Japan, Australia and New Caledonia.

Habitat
Pseudobalistes fuscus is a reef-associated species.

Diet
This triggerfish, like most other triggerfish, eats shellfish, small crustaceans, and other bottom-dwelling invertebrae.

References

External links
 

Fish of Thailand
Balistidae
Taxa named by Marcus Elieser Bloch
Taxa named by Johann Gottlob Theaenus Schneider
Fish described in 1801